Novitchenko is a rural locality (a selo) in Abramovskoye Rural Settlement, Talovsky District, Voronezh Oblast, Russia. The population was 106 as of 2010. There are 5 streets.

Geography 
Novitchenko is located 34 km northeast of Talovaya (the district's administrative centre) by road. Yelan-Kolenovsky is the nearest rural locality.

References 

Rural localities in Talovsky District